Cisamus or Kisamos was town of ancient Crete and was the port of Aptera. It appears as one of two towns of the name in the Peutinger Table. 

Its site is tentatively located at Kalami.

References

Populated places in ancient Crete
Former populated places in Greece